It's Goin' Down is the second studio album by American singer Ralph Tresvant. It was released by MCA Records on January 19, 1994 in the United States. Tresvant's second set had him take on more of a hands-on role as opposed to his debut. This time around, he wrote and produced the majority of the album, save for three songs written and produced by his longtime producers Jimmy Jam and Terry Lewis. Two singles were released from the album, including "Who's The Mack" and "When I Need Somebody." It's Goin' Down was met with lukewarm reviews, as it was noticeably different in style to its predecessor.

Critical reception

AllMusic editor Tim Griggs found that on his "follow-up to his solo debut, Tresvant attempts to show he is a bad mutha, but fails [...] Unfortunately, except for three of the tracks produced and written by the great production team of Jimmy Jam and Terry Lewis, Tresvant chose to write and produce the majority of the album himself – bad choice. Much like Janet Jackson's releases, it's amazing the quality difference between the Jam and Lewis tracks compared to the self-produced and written tracks. Tresvant destroyed whatever promise he showed on his self-titled debut release."

Track listing

Sample credits
"Graveyard" contains samples of "The Payback" by James Brown and "What's Going On" by Marvin Gaye.
"You'll Remember Me" contains samples from "More Bounce to the Ounce" as performed by Zapp.
"My Aphrodisiac" incorporates elements from "Jungle Boogie" as performed by Kool and the Gang
"Sex Maniac" incorporates elements from "Big Get Back" as performed by Terminator X.

Charts

References

1993 albums
MCA Records albums
Ralph Tresvant albums

es:It's Goin' Down